This is a list of the Official Charts Company's UK R&B Chart number-one singles of 2010.

Number ones

Number-one artists

See also

List of number-one singles of 2010 (UK)
List of UK Dance Chart number-one singles of 2010
List of UK Indie Chart number-one singles of 2010
List of UK Official Download Chart number-one singles of 2010
List of UK Rock Chart number-one singles of 2010
List of UK R&B Chart number-one albums of 2010

References
Note that the dates included in the below sources indicate when the respective chart weeks end (as opposed to the above standard dates when the new chart is announced).

External links
R&B Albums Top 40 at the Official Charts Company
UK Top 40 RnB Albums at BBC Radio 1

Number-one RandB hits
United Kingdom RandB singles
2010